Dean Craven (born 17 February 1979) is a footballer who played as a midfielder for Shrewsbury Town in the Football League.

References

1979 births
Living people
Sportspeople from Shrewsbury
English footballers
Association football midfielders
Shrewsbury Town F.C. players
Merthyr Tydfil F.C. players
Newtown A.F.C. players
Stafford Rangers F.C. players
Hednesford Town F.C. players
Bridgnorth Town F.C. players
Hereford United F.C. players
Grantham Town F.C. players
AFC Telford United players
Witton Albion F.C. players
English Football League players